Anna Vozakova (born 27 February 1989, St Petersburg) is a Russian beach volleyball player. She has competed alongside Anastasia Vasina at the 2012 Summer Olympics in London where they were defeated by the sisters Doris Schwaiger and Stefanie Schwaiger from Austria.

References

External links
 
 
 
 

1989 births
Russian beach volleyball players
Living people
Beach volleyball players at the 2012 Summer Olympics
Olympic beach volleyball players of Russia
Sportspeople from Saint Petersburg